William Guy Wheeler (November 11, 1861 – July 3, 1936) was an American lawyer and politician.  He was United States Attorney for the Western District of Wisconsin during the presidency of Theodore Roosevelt and served four years in the Wisconsin State Assembly, representing Rock County, Wisconsin.

Biography
Wheeler was born on November 11, 1861, in La Prairie, Wisconsin. He graduated from Janesville High School in Janesville, Wisconsin, in 1881.  In December 1881, he began studying law at the law office of Winans & Fethers and read law for three years, and, in 1884, was admitted to the State Bar of Wisconsin.  That same year he was hired as deputy clerk of the Wisconsin circuit court for Rock County, and, a year later, he took over as clerk.  He left office in 1887 and went into private practice, but was elected District attorney of Rock County in 1890 and served in that role until 1895.  He was elected to the Wisconsin State Assembly in 1896 to represent the Janesville-based Rock County 1st district, and was re-elected in 1898. In 1901, he was appointed United States Attorney for the Western District of Wisconsin by President Theodore Roosevelt and served through all of Roosevelt's eight years, leaving office in 1909.

He died on July 3, 1936, in Chicago, Illinois.

Electoral history

| colspan="6" style="text-align:center;background-color: #e9e9e9;"| General Election, November 3, 1896

| colspan="6" style="text-align:center;background-color: #e9e9e9;"| General Election, November 8, 1898

References

External links
The Political Graveyard

Politicians from Janesville, Wisconsin
United States Attorneys for the Western District of Wisconsin
Republican Party members of the Wisconsin State Assembly
District attorneys in Wisconsin
1861 births
1936 deaths
People from La Prairie, Wisconsin